Mizrahi (or Mizrachi) is a sephardic surname, given to Jews who got to the Iberian Peninsula from the east or Jews who lived in the eastern side of the peninsula. Notable people with the surname include:

 Alon Mizrahi (born 1971), Israeli association football player
 Avi Mizrahi (born 1957), Israeli general
 Baruch Mizrahi, (1926-1948), Muslim convert to Judaism, Irgun fighter
 Elijah Mizrachi (c. 1455–1525), rabbi and author of the supercommentary on Rashi known as The Mizrachi
 Isaac Mizrahi (born 1961), American fashion designer
 Joseph Misrahi (1895–1975), Egyptian Olympic fencer
 Togo Mizrahi (1901-1986), Egyptian Film Pioneer
 Michael Mizrachi (born 1981), American professional poker player
 Moshe Mizrahi (1950-2022), Israeli politician
 Moshe Mizrahi (basketball) (born 1980), Israeli basketball player
 Moshé Mizrahi (1931–2018), Israeli film director
 Motti Mizrachi (born 1946), Israeli artist
 Offer Mizrahi (born 1967), Israeli association football player
 Rasela Mizrahi, Macedonian politician
 Robert Mizrachi (born 1978), American professional poker player
 Shimon Mizrahi (born 1939), Israeli basketball executive, Israel Prize recipient
 Yossi Mizrahi (born 1953), Israeli association football player and manager

Fictional characters from Xenosaga
Joachim Mizrahi
Juli Mizrahi
MOMO Mizrahi (Xenosaga)
Sakura Mizrahi

See also

Hebrew-language surnames